This article documents the chronology of the response to the COVID-19 pandemic in July 2022, which originated in Wuhan, China in December 2019. Some developments may become known or fully understood only in retrospect. Reporting on this pandemic began in December 2019.

Reactions and measures in the United Nations

Reactions and measures in Africa

Reactions and measures in the Americas

Reactions and measures in the Eastern Mediterranean

Reactions and measures in Europe

Reactions and measures in South, East and Southeast Asia

Reactions and measures in the Western Pacific

1 July
Health authorities in Niue have tested passengers on a flight from New Zealand and launched contact tracing after five passengers tested positive for COVID-19.

14 July
On 15 July, New Zealand's COVID-19 Response Minister Ayesha Verrall announced that the Government would provide free masks and rapid antigen test kits. In addition, the New Zealand Government would make it easier for vulnerable patients to obtain a range of drugs including paxlovid, molnupiravir, and remdesivir.

See also 

 Timeline of the COVID-19 pandemic in July 2022
 Responses to the COVID-19 pandemic

References 

July 2022 events
Timelines of the COVID-19 pandemic in 2022
Responses to the COVID-19 pandemic in 2022